The North Carolina Alcoholic Beverage Control Commission is an agency of the government of North Carolina within the state's Department of Public Safety.

The Alcoholic Beverage Control bill, submitted to the state legislature in 1937, was enacted into law; it provided for the establishment of a State Board of Control, consisting of a Chairman and two associate members who would be appointed by the Governor. That Board is now known as the North Carolina Alcoholic Beverage Commission.

North Carolina is considered an alcoholic beverage control state as well as a local option state, as each county or city's voters decide whether alcohol shall be sold. There are 49 county and 106 municipal alcoholic beverage control boards across the state that sell spirits; sales of other alcoholic beverages are allowed or disallowed by the towns or counties.

State regulations require that each beer or wine product be approved by the Commission before being sold in North Carolina.

The Commission publishes the North Carolina Liquor Quarterly, which includes advertisements for alcoholic beverages and a list of the state's uniform prices for spirits.

References

External links

State alcohol agencies of the United States
Alcoholic Beverage Control Commission